Heliaeschna cynthiae is a species of dragonfly in the family Aeshnidae. It is found in Cameroon, Uganda, and Zambia. Its natural habitat is subtropical or tropical moist lowland forests.

References

Aeshnidae
Insects described in 1939
Taxonomy articles created by Polbot